Max Hirmer (1893-1981) was a German botanist, publisher and photographer.

Hirmer was born on 14 April 1893 in Straubing. After graduating from the Wilhelmsgymnasium in Munich in 1913, he studied
archaeology, art history and natural sciences. Hirmer received his doctorate from the University of Munich in 1917 and his habilitation in 1922. He was an adjunct professor in Munich from 1928 but was dismissed by the Nazis in 1936 for political reasons.

Hirmer wrote a number of works of botany including a book and many articles on phyllotaxis.

As a photographer, Hirmer worked mainly in the field of art and archeology. In 1948 he, together with his wife Aenne (1912-2017), founded the Gesellschaft für wissenschaftliches Lichtbild, or Society for the Scientific Photographic Image. This became the Hirmer-Verlag publishing house, which published numerous art studies and illustrated books. Hirmer's own books published with the firm included Ägypten. Architektur, Plastik, Malerei in drei Jahrtausenden (Egypt: Three Millennia of Architecture, Sculpture and Painting) for which he provided the photographs.

Selected works 

 Zur Lösung des Problems der Blattstellungen, 1922.
 
 With Eberhard Otto and Christiane Desroches-Noblecourt: Ägypten: Architektur, Plastik, Malerei in drei Jahrtausenden. Vierte neu bearbeitete und sehr erweiterte Auflage.

References

External links 
 
 
 Hirmer Verlag

1893 births
1981 deaths
20th-century German botanists
People from Straubing